The largest airlines in the world can be defined in several ways. , Delta Air Lines is the largest by revenue, assets value and market capitalization, China Southern Air Holding by passengers carried, American Airlines Group by revenue passenger mile, fleet size, numbers of employees and destinations served, FedEx Express by freight tonne-kilometers, Ryanair by number of routes, Turkish Airlines by number of countries served.

By company revenue

Note that Emirates is a state-owned company and is thus not included in this list of public companies. Its 2021 revenue was estimated over 18 billion USD, which would place the company into 5th place. Its 2014-2015 revenue was  billion ( billion), profit  billion ( billion), and assets  billion ( billion), with 56,725 employees. Qatar Airways Group is similarly privately held.

By passengers carried
Airline groups

Airlines
The IATA reports numbers for individual air operator's certificates and groups of multiple airlines can report larger numbers.

By scheduled passenger-kilometers flown (millions)

‡ - marks a defunct airline.

By scheduled freight tonne-kilometers (millions)

By fleet size

Aircraft

Aircraft capacity

By number of countries served

By number of routes

By number of destinations

By brand value

See also

 Flag carrier
 List of largest airlines in North America
 List of largest airlines in Europe
 List of largest airlines in Central America and the Caribbean
 List of largest airlines in Africa
 List of largest airlines in Asia
 List of largest airlines in South America
 List of largest airlines in Oceania
 List of airline holding companies
 List of the busiest airports in Africa
 List of the busiest airports in Asia
 List of the busiest airports in Europe
 List of the busiest airports in Latin America
 List of the busiest airports
 List of busiest airports by passenger traffic
 List of busiest airports by aircraft movements
 List of busiest passenger air routes

References